The Rikuu Line may refer to either or both of the following railway lines in Japan:
 Rikuu East Line
 Rikuu West Line